This page is about the Battle of Elena of 1877; for other battles, see Battle of Helena (disambiguation).

The Battle of Elena was a battle of the Russo-Turkish War of 1877–1878. It was fought between the Ottoman Empire and Imperial Russia in 1877. The Ottoman forces were commanded by Deli Fuad Pasha.

References
George Bruce. Harbottle's Dictionary of Battles. (Van Nostrand Reinhold, 1981).

Elena
Elena
Elena
1877 in Bulgaria
Balkan mountains
Elena
Elena
History of Veliko Tarnovo Province
July 1877 events